The 1st Regiment "Granatieri di Sardegna" is an active unit of the Italian Army based in Rome in Lazio. The regiment is part of the army's infantry arm's Granatieri (Grenadiers) speciality and assigned to the Mechanized Brigade "Granatieri di Sardegna". Formed in 1659 the regiment is the currently oldest active unit of the Italian Army and the most senior regiment in the Italian Army's infantry order of precedence. Together with its sister the regiment, the 2nd Regiment "Granatieri di Sardegna", the regiment is the guard regiment of Rome.

The regiment was formed in 1659 as guard regiment of the Dukes of Savoy on the battlefield. For the next 140 years the regiment participated in all wars of the Duchy of Savoy and Kingdom of Sardinia, distinguishing itself especially in the Battle of Assietta in 1747. In 1798 revolutionary France occupied Piedmont and the regiment was integrated into the Army of the French-controlled Piedmontese Republic. In 1799 Austrian forces occupied Piedmont and the regiment was disbanded. In 1814 Napoleon abdicated and the King of Sardinia returned from Sardinia to Turin, where the regiment was reformed. The regiment then participated in all three Italian Wars of Independence. In 1861 the regiment was awarded Italy's highest military order the Gold Medal of Military Valour for its conduct during the Siege of Gaeta.

During World War I the regiment fought on the Italian front, where it fought to annihilation in May 1916 on the Monte Cengio. For their defense of Monte Cengio the regiment and its sister regiment, the 2nd Regiment "Granatieri di Sardegna", were both awarded a Gold Medal of Military Valour. During World War II the regiment was assigned to the 21st Infantry Division "Granatieri di Sardegna", with which it served in occupied Yugoslavia as occupation force. Recalled to Rome in late 1942 the division fought invading German forces after the announcement of the Armistice of Cassibile on 8 September 1943. After a last stand at Porta San Paolo on 10 September the regiment and division were dissolved by the victorious Germans.
 
In 1946 the regiment was reformed and assigned to the Infantry Division "Granatieri di Sardegna". In 1975 the regiment was reduced to a battalion sized mechanized unit. In 1992 the regiment was reformed and has been active as mechanized unit since.

History

Formation 
In 1659, towards the end of the Franco-Spanish War, which had involved the Duchy of Savoy on the French side, Duke Charles Emmanuel II ordered that the best troops from Savoyard militia regiments should be transferred to regular regiments. On 18 April 1659 Duke Charles Emmanuel II ordered to form a Guards Regiment, which would protect the Duke during battles. The Guards Regiment consisted of twelve companies of 100 men each, six of which were transferred from existing regiments, while the other six were newly formed.

Cabinet Wars 
In 1663 the regiment was deployed to occupy the Val Pellice and Val Chisone valleys during that year's campaign against the Waldensian rebels. On 19 October 1664 Duke Charles Emmanuel II issued an order of precedence for his military, which ranked the Guards Regiment first among infantry regiments. This gave the regiment the right to march at the head of a column or parade, and regiment placed furthest right on inspection or in a line of battle.

In 1672 the regiment participated in the Second Genoese–Savoyard War. Between 1690 and 1697 the regiment participated in the Nine Years' War against the Kingdom of France. The regiment fought in 1690 in the Battle of Staffarda, in 1693 in the Battle of Marsaglia, in 1693 in the Siege of Pinerolo, and in 1695 in the Siege of Casale. On 2 April 1692 the regiment's companies had been organized into two battalions, with six companies per battalion. On 18 April 1696 one company from each of the regiment's two battalions was reorganized as a Grenadier company.

On 31 May 1701 the regiment added a third battalion and the same year Duke Victor Amadeus II joined the War of the Spanish Succession and the regiment fought in 1701 in the Battle of Chiari and in 1702 in the Battle of Luzzara. In 1704 the regiment's II and III battalions were taken prisoner by the French after the surrender of Vercelli. On 4 August of the same year the regiment was reorganized and now consisted of two battalions, with six fusilier companies and one grenadier company per battalion. In 1706 the regiment participated in the Defense of Turin. In 1707 the regiment fought in the Siege of Toulon and in 1708 the sieges of the forts of Exilles and Fenestrelle. In 1713 the war ended with the Peace of Utrecht, which transferred the Kingdom of Sicily and parts of the Duchy of Milan to Savoy. In October 1713 Victor Amadeus II and his wife, Anne Marie d'Orléans, travelled from Nice to Palermo, where the king and queen were crowned in the cathedral of Palermo on 24 December 1713. The Guards Regiment moved from Piedmont to Sicily.

In July 1718 Spain landed troops on Sicily and tried to recover the Kingdom of Sicily from Savoy rule. On 2 August 1718 Britain, France, Austria, and the Dutch Republic formed an alliance to defeat Spain in the War of the Quadruple Alliance. For the next two year the Guards Regiment fought Spanish forces in Sicily. The war ended with the 1720 Treaty of The Hague, which restored the position prior to 1717, but with Savoy and Austria exchanging Sardinia and Sicily.

In 1733 King Charles Emmanuel III joined the War of the Polish Succession on the French-Spanish side. In 1733 the regiment fought in the Siege of Pizzighettone and the following Siege of Milan. In 1734 the regiment fought in the Battle of San Pietro and the Battle of Guastalla against Austrian forces.

In 1742 King Charles Emmanuel III joined the War of the Austrian Succession on the Austrian side and the regiment participated in 1742 in the Siege of Mirandola and in 1743 in the First Battle of Casteldelfino. In 1744 the regiment fought in the Battle of Madonna dell'Olmo and in 1745 in the Battle of Bassignano. In 1745-46 the regiment participated in the sieges of Asti, Valenza, and Alessandria. In 1747 the regiment fought in the decisive Battle of Assietta.

In 1743 the name of the regiment had been changed to the Regiment of the Guards and in 1753 the regiment received white toggles around its uniform buttons to distinguish it from the other infantry regiments. From 21 October 1774 to 15 June 1786 the regiment consisted of three battalions.

French Revolutionary Wars 
In 1792 King Victor Amadeus III joined the War of the First Coalition against the French Republic. From 1792 to 1796 the regiment fought against the French Army of Italy. In March 1796 Napoleon Bonaparte arrived in Italy and took command of the French forces, with which he defeated the Royal Sardinian Army in the Montenotte campaign within a month. During the Montenotte campaign the regiment fought in the Battle of Ceva and the Battle of Mondovì.

In fall 1798 France invaded Piedmont and on 6 December 1798 French forces occupied Turin. On 8 December 1798 King Charles Emmanuel IV was forced to sign a document of abdication, which also ordered his former subjects to recognise French laws and his troops to obey the orders of the French Army. Charles Emmanuel IV went into exile on Sardinia, while his former territories became the Piedmontese Republic. On 9 December 1798 the Sardinian troops were released from their oath of allegiance to the King and sworn to the Piedmontese Republic, with the exception of the Regiment of Sardinia, which escaped that fate as it was out of reach of the French Army in Sardinia. On 8 February 1799 the Regiment of the Guards was integrated into the newly formed 1st Light Piedmontese Demi-brigade, which in spring 1799 fought with the French in the War of the Second Coalition against the Austrians. On 5 April 1799 the French lost the Battle of Magnano and were forced out of Italy. With the French retreat the Piedmontese Republic dissolved and the 1st Light Piedmontese Demi-brigade, like all military units of the Piedmontese Republic, was disbanded on 10 May 1799.

Immediately after the Austro-Russian army had entered Turin the Austrian began to reform Piedmontese regiments and by 10 June 1799 two companies with personnel of the Regiment of the Guards had been formed. On 10 September 1799 the process to reform a battalion of the Regiment of the Guards commenced and by 20 February 1800 a battalion of seven companies had been formed, with each company fielding four officers and 115 troops. On 26 May 1800 the battalion fought against the French vanguard at Chiusella and then retreated to the city of Turin. On 14 June 1800 Napoleon defeated the Austrians in the Battle of Marengo and forced the Austrians to leave Piedmont. On 24 June 1800 the personnel of the Guards battalion was forced the enter French service and assigned to four Piedmontese infantry battalions, which were assigned to the French 111th Demi-brigade of the Line and 112th Demi-brigade of the Line.

Restauration 
On 11 April 1814 Napoleon abdicated and on 20 May 1814 King Victor Emmanuel I returned from exile in Sardinia to Turin. On 24 May 1814 Victor Emmanuel I ordered to reform the regiments that had existed in 1798 and by July 1814 the 1st Battalion of the Guards Regiment consisted of four Fusilier, one Hunters, and one Grenadier company. On 1 January 1815 the regiment's reformation was completed with the formation of the regiment's 2nd Battalion.

On 26 February 1815 Napoleon escaped from Elba and on 1 March 1815 he landed in Golfe-Juan in France. This triggered the War of the Seventh Coalition, which Sardinia joined against France. The Guards Regiment participated in the Hundred Days campaign, during which the regiment fought on 6 July at Grenoble.

In 1815 the Royal Sardinian Army was reorganized and infantry regiments consisted of two battalions in peacetime. In wartime each regiment would be augmented with reservists to become a brigade of two regiments, with two battalions per regiment. Consequently, all infantry regiment were renamed brigades and on 1 November 1815 the Guards Regiment was renamed Guards Brigade. On 20 November of the same year the grenadiers of the provincial and regular infantry regiments were transferred to the Guards Brigade to bring it to full strength. Consequently, on 20 January 1816 King Victor Emmanuel I decreed that the brigade would be renamed Grenadier Guards Brigade.

1831 reform 

In 1831 the new King Charles Albert ordered that the uniform of the Grenadier Guards Brigade be modified and the white toggles be replaced with white gorget patches, which are still worn on the uniform today. On 25 October of the same year all infantry brigades of the army divided their battalions into two regiments. However, as the Grenadier Guards Brigade was too small to split into two regiments the brigade was reorganized, with the battalions of the brigade forming the 1st Grenadiers Regiment (Guards Brigade), which was joined in the brigade by the 2nd Hunters Regiment (Guards Brigade). The 1st Grenadiers Regiment consisted of a depot and two battalions, with five grenadier companies and one guard company per battalion, while the 2nd Hunters Regiment consisted of a depot in Sardinia and two battalions, with five hunter companies and one Carabinieri company per battalion. On 8 October 1833 the depot of the 1st Grenadiers Regiment was established in Turin. On 21 January 1834 the depot's personnel formed the regiment's III Battalion and a new IV Battalion was formed as depot unit. The same year the battalions were reorganized and now consisted of six grenadier companies and regiment added bearskin caps to its parade and guard uniform. In 1839 the 1st Grenadiers Regiment grew to four battalions and a depot battalion, while the 2nd Hunters Regiment grew to three battalions and a depot battalion. As the 2nd Hunters Regiment had its roots in Sardinia, the depot battalion and one of its regular battalions were based on the island, while the other two battalions were based in Piedmont.

Italian Wars of Independence

First Italian War of Independence 
On 23 March 1848 the First Italian War of Independence began and the Guards Brigade formed two regiments for the war: the 1st Grenadiers Regiment, which consisted of the I and III grenadier battalions and the I Hunters Battalion; and the 2nd Grenadiers Regiment, which consisted of the II and IV grenadier battalions and the II Hunters Battalion. In this form the brigade fought in 1848 in the battles of Pastrengo, Santa Lucia, Goito, Sommacampagna, Staffalo, Custoza, and Milan. On 14 October 1848 the brigade was reorganized and now consisted of the following units:

 Guards Brigade
 1st Grenadiers Regiment (I and III Grenadier battalions)
 2nd Grenadiers Regiment (II and IV Grenadier battalions)
 1st Hunters Regiment (I and II Hunter battalions)

On 6 February 1849 both grenadiers regiments added a third battalion and on 10 February the Provisional Grenadier Guards Regiment was formed, which consisted of the freshly levied I and II Provisional Grenadier Guards battalions. On 11 March 1849 this regiment was renamed 3rd Grenadier Guards Regiment.

In 1849 the Guards Brigade fought in the battles of Mortara and Novara. After the Sardinian defeat in the war the 3rd Grenadier Guards Regiment was disbanded in June 1849 and on 12 October 1849 the 1st Grenadiers Regiment and 2nd Grenadiers Regiment were reduced to a staff and two battalions each, with four grenadiers and one guard company per battalion. On 20 April 1850 the 1st Hunters Regiment left the brigade and was renamed Hunters Regiment of Sardinia. On the same date the Guards Brigade was renamed Grenadiers Brigade.

On 16 March 1852 the Hunters Regiment of Sardinia was disbanded and its battalions merged into the two regiments of the Grenadiers Brigade, which was renamed on the same date Grenadiers of Sardinia Brigade, while the traditions of the Hunters Regiment of Sardinia were assigned to the 2nd Grenadiers Regiment. Both grenadier regiments of the brigade consisted now of a staff and four battalions, with each battalion fielding four companies.

In 1855 the regiment's 1st, 5th, 9th, and 13th company were used to form the I Battalion of the 1st Provisional Regiment of the Sardinian expeditionary corps, which fought in the Crimean War and distinguished itself on 16 August 1855 in the Battle of the Chernaya.

Second Italian War of Independence 
On 26 April 1859 the Second Italian War of Independence began and the brigade fought in the Battle of Solferino and the Battle of Peschiera. On 12 July 1859 the war ended with the Armistice of Villafranca, which included the transfer of Lombardy from the Austrian Empire to the Second French Empire and then onward to the Kingdom of Sardinia. On 1 November 1859 the 1st Grenadiers Regiment (Grenadiers of Sardinia Brigade) ceded its II and IV Battalion to help form the 3rd Grenadiers Regiment (Grenadiers of Lombardy Brigade) and the 2nd Grenadiers Regiment (Grenadiers of Sardinia Brigade) ceded its II and IV Battalion to help form the 4th Grenadiers Regiment (Grenadiers of Lombardy Brigade). On 5 November of the same year the two regiments of the Grenadiers of Sardinia Brigade reformed their two ceded battalions and all four grenadier regiments consisted now of four battalions.

In the 1860-1861 the brigade participated in the campaign in central and southern Italy and fought in the Battle of Perugia, the Siege of Ancona, the Battle of Mola, and the Siege of Gaeta. For its conduct during the Siege of Gaeta the 1st Grenadiers Regiment was awarded a Gold Medal of Military Valour and for its conduct during the Battle of Perugia the regiment was awarded a Silver Medal of Military Valour. Additionally the regiment's medical corps was awarded a Bronze Medal of Military Valour for its conduct at Perugia.

On 27 January 1861 the Kingdom of Sardinia annexed the Kingdom of the Two Sicilies and on 17 March of the same year the Proclamation of the Kingdom of Italy was issued. On 16 April 1861 the two grenadier regiments of the Grenadiers of Sardinia Brigade ceded their IV battalions to help form the 5th Grenadiers Regiment (Grenadiers of Naples Brigade), while on the same date the two grenadier regiments of the Grenadiers of Lombardy Brigade ceded their IV battalions to help form the 6th Grenadiers Regiment (Grenadiers of Naples Brigade). All six grenadier regiments consisted of a staff and three battalions, with six grenadier companies per battalion.

On 1 August 1862 the 1st, 3rd, and 5th grenadier regiments ceded their 17th and 18th companies to help form the 7th Grenadiers Regiment (Grenadiers of Tuscany Brigade), while on the same date the 2nd, 4th, and 6th grenadier regiments ceded their 17th and 18th companies to help form the 8th Grenadiers Regiment (Grenadiers of Tuscany Brigade). All eight grenadier regiments consisted of a staff and three battalions, with six grenadier companies per battalion.

In 1861-65 the 1st Grenadiers Regiment operated in southern Italy to suppress the anti-Sardinian revolt that resisted the annexation of the Kingdom of Two Sicilies.

Third Italian War of Independence 
In 1866 the regiment participated in the Third Italian War of Independence and fought in the Battle of Custoza.

On 5 March 1871 all Royal Italian Army infantry regiments were reorganized and now consisted of a staff company, a depot company, and three battalions, with four companies per battalion. On 1 April 1871 the six grenadier regiments of the Grenadiers of Lombardy, Grenadiers of Naples, and Grenadiers of Tuscany brigades were transferred to the line infantry. On 15 October of the same year the brigade level was abolished and the two grenadier regiments of the Grenadiers of Sardinia Brigade were renamed 1st Regiment "Granatieri di Sardegna" respectively 2nd Regiment "Granatieri di Sardegna".

On 2 January 1881 the brigade level was reintroduced and the two regiments were renamed again as 1st Grenadiers Regiment (Brigade "Granatieri di Sardegna") and 2nd Grenadiers Regiment (Brigade "Granatieri di Sardegna").

In 1895-96 the regiment provided eleven officers and 332 enlisted for units deployed to Italian Eritrea for the First Italo-Ethiopian War.

Italo-Turkish War 
In 1911 the regiment's III Battalion was deployed to Libya for the Italo-Turkish War. On 26 November  1911 the battalion fought at Henni Mesri and on 4 December in the Battle of Ain Zara. In 1912 the battalion fought at Gargarish, at Bu-Chemez, on 26–28 June in the occupation of Sidi Said, and in the Battle of Sidi Alo. In 1913 the battalion participated in the occupation of El Agheila.

World War I 

At the outbreak of World War I the regiment consisted of three battalions, each of which fielded four fusiliers companies and one machine gun section. After Italy's entry into the war on 23 May 1915 the Brigade "Granatieri di Sardegna" was deployed, as per tradition, on the extreme right of the Italian front at Monfalcone on the shores of the Adriatic Sea. In June and July 1915 the brigade participated in the First Battle of the Isonzo and in the Second Battle of the Isonzo in the Monfalcone sector. In October of the same year the brigade was transferred to the Monte Sabotino sector, where it fought in the Third Battle of the Isonzo. In November the brigade fought in the Fourth Battle of the Isonzo in the Oslavia area.

In May 1916 the brigade was transferred to the Sette Comuni plateau to reinforce Italian units under heavy attack by Austro-Hungarian forces during the Battle of Asiago. From 29 May to 3 June the brigade strenuously defended Monte Cengio against a series of ferocious Austro-Hungarian attacks. On 4 June the remnants of the brigade were ordered to fall back to the Italian positions on Monte Pau. On 7 June the survivors of the brigade were relieved from the front and merged into a single battalion. The defense of Monte Cengio had cost the brigade 4,615 casualties out of approximately 6,000 men the brigade fielded when it arrived on the Sette Comuni Plateau.

After being reformed in the rear the brigade was back at the front in August 1916 for the Sixth Battle of the Isonzo. This time the brigade fought on the Karst plateau on Monte San Michele and on Nad Logem. In September of the same year the brigade fought in the Seventh Battle of the Isonzo in the area of Fornaza. On 28 December 1916 the two regiments of the brigade were both awarded a Silver Medal of Military Valour for their conduct during the first two years of the war.

In May and June 1917 the brigade fought in Tenth Battle of the Isonzo on the Karst plateau and suffered 3,201 casualties in futile attempts to conquer Austro-Hungarian positions. In August of the same year the brigade fought in the Eleventh Battle of the Isonzo on the area of Opatje Selo. After the Italian defeat in the Battle of Caporetto the brigade covered the Italian retreat to the Piave river, suffering another 2,895 casualties during the retreat.

In June 1918 the brigade was kept in reserve during the Second Battle of the Piave River, but on 2 July the brigade was ordered to cross the old Piave river and drive the Austro-Hungarian forces back over the new Piave river in the area of Musile di Piave. By 7 July the Italian forces had succeeded to push back the enemy lines, with the grenadiers suffering another 954 casualties. In November 1918, after the Austro-Hungarian forces had been routed in the Battle of Vittorio Veneto, the brigade advanced to the Livenza river and from there to the bridges at Latisana. For their conduct on Monte Cengio and at Fornaza the two grenadier regiments were both awarded a Gold Medal of Military Valour after the war.

Interwar years 
After the war the two regiments were reduced to two battalions per regiment, with three grenadier companies and one machine gunners company per battalion. On 31 October 1926 the Brigade "Granatieri di Sardegna" was renamed XXI Infantry Brigade. On the same date the brigade's two regiments were renamed 1st Regiment "Granatieri di Sardegna", respectively 2nd Regiment "Granatieri di Sardegna". The XXI Infantry Brigade was the infantry component of the 21st Territorial Division of Rome. As infantry brigades formed in 1926 consisted of three regiments on 4 November the 3rd Regiment "Granatieri di Sardegna" was formed in Viterbo. The new regiment's I Battalion and depot were formed with personnel ceded by the 1st Regiment "Granatieri di Sardegna", while the II Battalion and the new regiment's command were formed with personnel ceded by the 2nd Regiment "Granatieri di Sardegna". All three grenadier regiments consisted of a command, a command company, two grenadier battalions, and a depot.

On 8 February 1934 the 21st Territorial Division of Rome changed its name to Infantry Division "Granatieri di Sardegna". In 1935-36 the regiment contributed 21 officers and 236 enlisted for units, which were deployed to East Africa for the Second Italo-Ethiopian War. After the war the regimental depot of the 1st Regiment "Granatieri di Sardegna" in Rome formed the 10th Regiment "Granatieri di Savoia", which was mustered on 12 October 1936 and assigned to the 65th Infantry Division "Granatieri di Savoia" on 26 October 1936. The division was then transferred to Italian occupied Ethiopia.

On 6 April 1939 a provisional regiment with elements from all three grenadier regiments was formed for the Italian invasion of Albania. In the night from 7 to 8 April a battalion of that regiment was airlifted to Tirana with the rest of the provisional regiment following by sea a few days later. As the Royal Italian Army reorganized its divisions as binary divisions the 3rd Regiment "Granatieri di Sardegna" left the Infantry Division "Granatieri di Sardegna" and became an autonomous unit. On 25 July 1939 the 3rd Regiment moved from Viterbo to Tirana, where it replaced the provisional regiment, which was repatriated and disbanded in Rome on 28 July.

World War II

21st Infantry Division "Granatieri di Sardegna" 

At the outbreak of World War II the regiment consisted of a command, a command company, three grenadier battalions, a support weapons battery equipped with 65/17 infantry support guns, and a mortar company equipped with 81mm Mod. 35 mortars. In June 1940 during the invasion of France the division was in the reserve and not involved in any operations.

In May 1941 the division was transferred to occupied Yugoslavia, where it remained on anti-partisan duty until the second half of November 1942, when it returned to Rome to defend the city in case of an Allied attack.

After the announcement of the Armistice of Cassibile on 8 September 1943 the division, together with the 12th Infantry Division "Sassari" and the Armored Reconnaissance Grouping "Lancieri di Montebello" (8th) defended Rome against invading German forces. On 10 September the Granatieri, Lancieri di Montebello, remnants of the Sassari and hundreds of civilians fell back to Porta San Paolo for a last stand. By 17:00 the Germans broke the line of the Italian defenders, who had suffered 570 dead. Soon after the units surrendered to the Germans as the flight of the Italian King Victor Emmanuel III from Rome made further resistance senseless. The division and its regiments were declared lost due to wartime events on 10 September 1943.

For their role in the defence of the Rome the 1st Regiment "Granatieri di Sardegna" and the "Lancieri di Montebello" were each awarded a Silver Medal of Military Valour, while the 2nd Regiment "Granatieri di Sardegna" was awarded a Bronze Medal of Military Valour.

Minor units 
During the war the depots of the two grenadier regiments in Rome formed the following autonomous units:

 IV Truck-transported Anti-tank Battalion, equipped with 47/32 anti-tank guns
 XXXII Truck-transported Anti-tank Battalion, equipped with 47/32 anti-tank guns
 21st Anti-tank Cannons Company, equipped with 47/32 anti-tank guns
 121st Anti-tank Cannons Company, equipped with 47/32 anti-tank guns
 203rd, 204th, and 205th anti-aircraft companies
 II Replacements Battalion 
 Special Grouping "Granatieri di Sardegna"

The IV Truck-transported Anti-tank Battalion consisted of three anti-tank cannons companies and was transferred in December 1941 to North Africa for the Western Desert Campaign. On 13 January 1942 the battalion arrived in Tripolitania and was assigned to the 132nd Armored Division "Ariete". After the Axis defeat in the Second Battle of El Alamein the survivors of the battalion retreated to Tunisia, where the battalion was assigned to the 66th Infantry Regiment "Trieste" of the 101st Motorized Division "Trieste" for the Tunisian Campaign. The 21st Anti-tank Cannons Company was also transferred to North Africa and served in the Tunisian Campaign. Both units were lost when Axis forces in North Africa surrendered on 13 May 1943.

The XXXII Truck-transported Anti-tank Battalion consisted of three anti-tank cannons companies and was, together with the 121st Anti-tank Cannons Company, assigned to the Italian Army in Russia/8th Army and sent in 1942 to the Eastern Front. The XXXII Truck-transported Anti-tank Battalion was initially assigned to the 5th Infantry Division "Cosseria" and then the 3rd Infantry Division "Ravenna", while the 121st Anti-tank Cannons Company was assigned to the 2nd Infantry Division "Sforzesca". Both units were destroyed during on the Don river during the Soviet Operation Little Saturn in December 1942 and the Ostrogozhsk–Rossosh offensive, which began on 13 Januar 1943.

The three anti-aircraft companies were deployed in Sicily to guard rail installations: the 203rd in Palermo, the 204th in Syracuse, and the 205th in Agrigento. All three companies were destroyed during the Allied invasion of Sicily. The II Replacements Battalion remained in Yugoslavia when the 21st Infantry Division "Granatieri di Sardegna" returned to Rome. The battalion was disbanded by German forces after the announcement of the Armistice of Cassibile.

The Special Grouping "Granatieri di Sardegna" consisted of three grenadier battalions, which were deployed to Sardinia (I and II battalions) and occupied Corsica (III Battalion).

Italian Co-belligerent Army 
After the announcement of the Armistice of Cassibile the Special Grouping "Granatieri di Sardegna" remained loyal to King Victor Emmanuel III and joined the Italian Co-belligerent Army. On 15 May 1944 the Special Grouping "Granatieri di Sardegna" was reorganized as Grenadiers Division and the battalions of the grouping were used form the 1st Grenadiers Regiment and the 2nd Grenadiers Regiment. The division also included the 32nd Tank Infantry Regiment, 132nd Tank Infantry Regiment, 553rd Artillery Regiment, and 548th Artillery Regiment.

On 7 August 1944 the 1st Grenadiers Regiment moved from Sardinia to Afragola in southern Italy and was assigned to the Division "Friuli". On 21 August the regiment was disbanded and its personnel formed a grenadiers battalion, which was inserted into the 87th Infantry Regiment "Friuli" as the regiment's III Battalion. On 20 September 1944 the division was as reorganized as Combat Group "Friuli" and received British weapons, uniforms and materiel. On 5 February 1945 the Friuli entered combat and served for the remainder of the war in the Italian campaign.

Cold War 

On 1 July 1946 the 1st Regiment "Granatieri di Sardegna" was reformed in Rome. The regiment consisted of a command, a command platoon (later increased to a command company), and three battalions. The regiment soon added a Mortar Company equipped with 81mm Mod. 35 mortars and a Anti-tank Cannons Company with QF 6-pounder anti-tank guns. On 1 April 1948 the regiment was assigned to the Infantry Division "Granatieri di Sardegna". In the early 1960s the regiment formed the IV Mechanized Battalion in Civitavecchia.

During the 1975 army reform the Italian Army disbanded the regimental level and newly independent battalions were granted for the first time their own flags. On 31 August 1975 the I Battalion of the 1st Regiment "Granatieri di Sardegna" was renamed 1st Grenadiers Battalion "Assietta", while the regiment's II Battalion was renamed 2nd Grenadiers Battalion "Cengio". On 30 September 1975 the 1st Regiment "Granatieri di Sardegna" and the regiment's III and IV battalions were disbanded. The next day the 1st Grenadiers Battalion "Assietta" was renamed 1st Mechanized Grenadiers Battalion "Assietta" and assigned the flag and traditions of the 1st Regiment "Granatieri di Sardegna", while the 2nd Grenadiers Battalion "Cengio" was renamed 2nd Mechanized Grenadiers Battalion "Cengio" and assigned the flag and traditions of the 2nd Regiment "Granatieri di Sardegna". The two battalions consisted of a command, a command and services company, three mechanized companies with M113 armored personnel carriers, and a heavy mortar company with M106 mortar carriers with 120mm Mod. 63 mortars. On 1 November 1976 the Infantry Division "Granatieri di Sardegna" was reorganized as Mechanized Brigade "Granatieri di Sardegna" and both battalions were assigned to the brigade.

Recent times 
On 1 October 1992 the 1st Mechanized Grenadiers Battalion "Assietta" lost its autonomy and the next day the battalion entered the reformed 1st Regiment "Granatieri di Sardegna" as Grenadiers Battalion "Assietta". From 26 June 1993 to 7 January 1994 one company of the regiment participated in the United Nations Operation in Somalia II.

On 29 October 2002 the 2nd Regiment "Granatieri di Sardegna" was disbanded and its remaining companies assigned to the 1st Regiment "Granatieri di Sardegna" as detachment in Spoleto. On 21 November 2017 these companies were used to reform the 2nd Grenadiers Battalion "Cengio" in Spoleto, which remained assigned to the 1st Regiment "Granatieri di Sardegna". On the same date the Grenadiers Battalion "Assietta" was renamed 1st Grenadiers Battalion "Assietta". On 31 August 2022 the 2nd Grenadiers Battalion "Cengio" left the 1st Regiment and the next day the 2nd Regiment "Granatieri di Sardegna" was reformed in Spoleto.

Current structure 
As of 2023 the 1st Regiment "Granatieri di Sardegna" consists of:

  Regimental Command, in Rome
 Command and Logistic Support Company
 1st Grenadiers Battalion "Assietta"
 1st Grenadiers Company
 2nd Grenadiers Company
 3rd Grenadiers Company
 4th Maneuver Support Company
 Honor Guard Company

The Command and Logistic Support Company fields the following platoons: C3 Platoon, Transport and Materiel Platoon, Medical Platoon, and Commissariat Platoon. The regiment is equipped with tracked Dardo infantry fighting vehicles. The Maneuver Support Company is equipped with M106 120mm mortar carriers and Dardo IFVs with Spike LR anti-tank guided missiles.

See also 
 Mechanized Brigade "Granatieri di Sardegna"

External links
Italian Army Website: 1° Reggimento "Granatieri di Sardegna"

References

Granatieri Regiments of Italy
Grenadier regiments